Weidlich is a surname. Notable people with the surname include:

Bärbel Podeswa (née Weidlich; born 1946), East German hurdler
Denis Weidlich (born 1986), Ghanaian-German footballer
Helmut Weidlich (born 1937), German cross-country skier
Kevin Weidlich (born 1989), German-Ghanaian footballer